Trametes trogii is a species of fungus belonging to the family Polyporaceae.

It has almost cosmopolitan distribution.

Synonym:
 Funalia trogii (Berk.) Bondartsev & Singer, 1941

References

Polyporaceae